"Sustainable" (Sasutenaburu) is the 56th single by Japanese idol group AKB48. It was released in Japan by King Records on September 18, 2019, in seven versions. It debuted at number one on the Oricon Singles Chart and Billboard Japan Hot 100, with over 1.6 million copies sold in Japan in its first week, making it the highest weekly sales of the year. It was the best-selling single of 2019 in Japan.
The lead performer for the main track is Moeka Yahagi, and this is also her last single as well.

This single is released in four physical different version, Type A, Type B, Type C and Theater Edition.

Commercial performance
"Sustainable" is the 43rd consecutive single by AKB48 to debut at number one. It is AKB48's first single of the Reiwa period and first release in six months.

Personnel

"Sustainable"

(19 members, Moeka Yahagi center) 
 Team A: Mion Mukaichi, Yui Yokoyama
 Team K: Tomu Muto, Moeka Yahagi
 Team B: Yuki Kashiwagi
 Team 4: Nana Okada, Yuiri Murayama 
 Team 8: Rin Okabe, Yui Oguri, Narumi Kuranoo, Nagisa Sakaguchi
 SKE48 Team S: Jurina Matsui
 Team E: Akari Suda
 NMB48 Team N: Akari Yoshida
 Team M: Miru Shiroma
 HKT48 Team H: Miku Tanaka
 NGT48 1st Generation: Hinata Homma
 STU48: Chiho Ishida, Yumiko Takino

"Sukida Sukida Sukida"
 Team 8's song. (16 members, Yui Oguri center)
 Team 8: Hatsuka Utada, Nao Ota, Momoka Onishi, Rin Okabe, Yui Oguri, Erina Oda, Narumi Kuranoo, Yurina Gyoten, Nagisa Sakaguchi, Akari Sato, Nanami Sato, Miu Shitao, Serika Nagano, Yui Yokoyama, Nanase Yoshikawa, Airi Rissen

"Seishun Da Capo"
 AKB48 Coupling Senbatsu. (16 members, Nanami Asai center)
 Team A: Rena Kato, Kurumi Suzuki, Manaka Taguchi, Erii Chiba, Rei Nishikawa, Ayaka Maeda, Suzuha Yamane
 Team K: Haruka Komiyama
 Team B: Saho Iwatate, Satone Kubo, Yukari Sasaki, Megu Tanniguchi, Yui Hiwatashi, Seina Fukuoka
 Team 4: Nanami Asai, Kaori Inagaki

"Monica, Yoake Da"
 48 Group NEXT12. (12 members, Mizuki Yamauchi & Cocona Umeyama centers)
 Team B: Maho Omori
 Team 4; Mizuki Yamauchi
 SKE48 Team E: Kaho Sato, Oka Suenaga
 NMB48 Team BII: Cocona Umeyama, Ayaka Yamamoto
 HKT48 Team KIV: Hirona Unjo
 Team TII: Hinata Matsumoto
 NGT48 1st Generation: Moeka Takakura
 Kenkyuusei: Saaya Kawagoe
 STU48: Mitsuki Imamura, Hina Iwata

"Nagareboshi ni Nani wo Negaeba Ii no Darou"
 Soukantoku to Captains. (5 members, Mion Mukaichi center)
 Team A: Mion Mukaichi  
 Team K: Haruka Komiyama
 Team B: Saho Iwatate
 Team 4: Yuiri Murayama
 Team 8: Rin Okabe

Track listing

Charts

Weekly charts

Year-end charts

References

2019 singles
2019 songs
AKB48 songs
Oricon Weekly number-one singles
Billboard Japan Hot 100 number-one singles